Bonnie Bell, Bonne Bell or Bonny Bell might refer to:

 Bonne Bell Cosmetics Company
 Bonnie Bell, California, in Riverside County
 Bonnie Bell, a Character in the 1923 film The Man Next Door
 Bonnie Bell (song), composed by Joseph Buell Carey
 Bonny Bell, a painting by Robert Herdman